Youssef Fares may refer to:

 Youssef Fares (sport shooter) (1906–?), Egyptian sports shooter
 Youssef Fares (neurosurgeon), Lebanese neurosurgeon, academic and healthcare leader